Charles Beautron Major (March 18, 1851 – May 15, 1924) was a lawyer, judge and political figure in Quebec. He represented Ottawa electoral district in the Legislative Assembly of Quebec from 1897 to 1904 and Labelle in the House of Commons of Canada from 1907 to 1911 as a Liberal.

He was born in Sainte-Scholastique, Canada East, the son of Joseph Beautron dit Major and Elmire Biroleau. His father was a leader in the Lower Canada Rebellion. In 1876, Major married Cymodocie Trudel,. He was admitted to the Quebec bar in 1877 and set up practice in Montreal with Raymond Préfontaine. He later moved to Papineauville and then to Hull, where he practised with Hyacinthe-Adélard Fortier, who became his son-in-law in 1901. Major was a promoter and later director of the Northern Colonization Railway. He served as mayor of Papineauville and was warden for Ottawa County in 1891 and 1892. He was first elected to the House of Commons in a 1917 by-election held after Henri Bourassa resigned his seat. Major was defeated when he ran for reelection to the House of Commons in 1911. In 1913, he was named judge for Montcalm, Pontiac, Ottawa and Terrebonne districts. Major died in Papineauville at the age of 73.

References 

Liberal Party of Canada MPs
Members of the House of Commons of Canada from Quebec
Quebec Liberal Party MNAs
Judges in Quebec
1851 births
1924 deaths
People from Laurentides